Bad Heart is a locality in northern Alberta, Canada within the County of Grande Prairie No. 1.

Bad Heart was formed around the Bad Heart School District, established on November 6, 1928 for the northeast part of the county.

The name "Bad Heart" appears to be "a translation of the Cree word "maatsiti" or "missipi". G.M. Dawson of the Geological Survey of Canada also referred to it in 1879 as Wicked River. Either one of these names may refer to the narrow 125 m-high canyon through which the river flows along its winding route, or the name might have spiritual significance."

On July 18, 1929, a post office was approved in the home of R.J. Magee in the community.  Bad Heart is also the location of the Bad Heart Straw Church, a national historic site. In the 1950s, this church was built of straw bales by Father Francis Dales, a Redemptorist priest stationed at Sexsmith, Alberta. After the one-room school burned down

in 1948, the Bad Heart school district was split into North and South Bad Heart, but in 1955 both were consolidated to Teepee Creek. The post office closed in 1968 but the Straw Church remains in place as an historic site.

References

Localities in the County of Grande Prairie No. 1